The 2006 Northern Iowa Panthers football team represented the University of Northern Iowa in the 2006 NCAA Division I FCS football season. The team was coached by fifth-year head coach Mark Farley and played their home games in the UNI-Dome.

Schedule

Coaching staff

References

Northern Iowa
Northern Iowa Panthers football seasons
Northern Iowa Panthers football